Andrew Burnap (born March 5, 1991) is an American actor. Known for his performances on stage he starred in the Public Theatre's revival of King Lear in 2014 and Troilus and Cressida in 2016. He gained prominence for his role as Toby Darling in the Matthew Lopez play The Inheritance which premiered on the West End and transferred on Broadway  for which he won the Tony Award for Best Actor in a Play. In 2023 he portrayed King Arthur in the Broadway revival of the Lerner and Loewe musical Camelot. 

Burnapp is also known for his role on television including as Phil in the Apple TV+ series WeCrashed (2022), and as Joseph Smith in the FX on Hulu limited series Under the Banner of Heaven (2022).

Early life and education  
He was born and raised in South Kingstown, Rhode Island, and graduated from the University of Rhode Island.

Career  
Burnapp started his career in productions from the Public Theatre. In 2014 he was in the ensemble in the revival of King Lear starring John Lithgow, Annette Benning and Yahya Abdul-Mateen II. In 2016 he starred as Troilus in Troilus and Cressida in 2016. He gained prominence for his role as Toby Darling in the Matthew Lopez play The Inheritance which premiered on the West End and transferred on Broadway for which he won the Tony Award for Best Actor in a Play.

In 2022, Burnapp starred as Phil in the Apple TV+ series WeCrashed opposite Anne Hathaway and Jared Leto, and as Joseph Smith in the FX on Hulu limited series Under the Banner of Heaven with Andrew Garfield and Daisy Edgar-Jones. In March 2023 he portrayed King Arthur in the Broadway revival of the Lerner and Loewe musical Camelot. Burnapp starred opposite Phillipa Soo as Guinevere in the new book by Aaron Sorkin.

Acting credits

Film

Television

Video games

Theatre

Awards and nominations

References

External links 

 
 
 

1991 births
Living people
21st-century American male actors
American male film actors
American male stage actors
American male television actors
Male actors from Rhode Island
People from South Kingstown, Rhode Island
Tony Award winners
University of Rhode Island alumni